Donald Snow Knowlton (November 22, 1892 – July 27, 1976) was an American public relations executive. He co-founded Hill and Knowlton with John W. Hill.

Life and career
Knowlton was born in Cleveland, Ohio. He graduated from Lincoln-West High School and Western Reserve University. He became advertising manager at Union Trust Co., including managing the bank-owned radio station WJAX. He authored the 1926 book These Bankers during that time. Union Trust closed during the Great Depression, so Knowlton joined Hill in the new venture. In 1946, Hill and Knowlton dissolved their partnership, and Knowlton took over the direction of Hill & Knowlton Cleveland, which closed shortly after Knowlton's retirement in 1962.

Knowlton also maintained an interest in music. His mother, Fanny Snow Knowlton, was a composer. He was a banjoist in a jazz band as an adult. Knowlton wrote one of the first serious discussions of jazz as an American art form in a 1926 article for Harper's, entitled "The Anatomy of Jazz."

Selected publications

Profit and Loss (1944)
Brick House Stories (1936)
Advertising for Banks (1932)
Cooperation in Public Relations (1931)
These Bankers (1926)

References

External links
Donald Snow Knowlton via The Encyclopedia of Cleveland History at Case Western Reserve University
John W. Hill (r) and Don S. Knowlton, of the public relations firm of Hill & Knowlton, giving testimony before the Senate Civil Liberties Committee on steel company public relations campaign via United States Library of Congress

1892 births
1976 deaths
Public relations pioneers
20th-century American businesspeople
Businesspeople from Cleveland